Charith Rajapakshe (born 29 January 1993) is a Sri Lankan cricketer. He made his Twenty20 debut for Chilaw Marians Cricket Club in the 2017–18 SLC Twenty20 Tournament on 1 March 2018.

References

External links
 

1993 births
Living people
Sri Lankan cricketers
Chilaw Marians Cricket Club cricketers
Lankan Cricket Club cricketers
Place of birth missing (living people)